Shockey is a surname. Notable people with the surname include:

Jeff Shockey, US lobbyist and Congressional staffer
Jeremy Shockey (born 1980), American football player
Peter Shockey, filmmaker and screenwriter

See also
Shockey Peak, 2010 m, southeast of Allen Peak near the north extremity of the main ridge of the Sentinel Range, Antarctica